

Jakob Künzler (March 8, 1871 – January 15, 1949) was a Swiss  who resided in an oriental mission in Urfa and who witnessed the Armenian genocide.

Born in Hundwil, Switzerland, he worked in the canton Appenzell and made a living as a carpenter. Afterwards he was trained in Basel as an evangelist deacon (Krankenpfleger). In 1899 he traveled to Urfa in Turkey, where he found his own place to work. He continued to study medicine until he became an independent operating surgeon, and later in 1905 he married Elizabeth Bender, daughter of a Christian missionary and granddaughter of an Ethiopian princess.

From 1915 to 1917 Künzler became an eyewitness to the Armenian genocide, the subject of his 1921 book  In the Land of Blood and Tears. Despite mortal danger he helped provide, when he could, for thousands of Armenian orphans and resumed his hospital enterprise in Urfa.

He was a Swiss pharmacist who had remained in Turkey serving the sick and wounded, non-Muslims and Muslims alike, in a hospital in Urfa who documented accounts of massacres of various Armenian labor battalion companies.

In October 1922 he closed his hospital he worked in and moved his family to Ghazir, near Beirut, where later he opened a center for orphans. Later he established a settlement for Armenian widows in Beirut and a lung sanatorium in Azounieh.

Jakob Künzler observed in August 1915:

Künzler also witnessed the deportations of Kurds, of which he wrote:

He died in Ghazir, Lebanon. He was buried and remains interred in the French Protestant Cemetery of Beirut.

Prizes and honors 
 1947 award by the University of Basel
 1959 memorial in Hundwil
 1971 earnings/service medals of the Lebanese government
 1971 memorial in Hundwil and Walzenhausen, Switzerland (1971).

Literature 
 1929: In the Land of Blood and Tears
 1959: Jakob, the Resource in the Service of Life

See also
Witnesses and testimonies of the Armenian genocide

References

External links

Swiss surgeons
1871 births
1949 deaths
Witnesses of the Armenian genocide